A ternary  numeral system (also called base 3 or trinary) has three as its base. Analogous to a bit, a ternary digit is a trit (trinary digit). One trit is equivalent to log2 3 (about 1.58496) bits of information.

Comparison to other bases

Representations of integer numbers in ternary do not get uncomfortably lengthy as quickly as in binary. For example, decimal 365 or senary 1405 corresponds to binary 101101101 (nine digits) and to ternary 111112 (six digits). However, they are still far less compact than the corresponding representations in bases such as decimalsee below for a compact way to codify ternary using nonary (base 9) and septemvigesimal (base 27).

Sum of the digits in ternary as opposed to binary

Similarly, for a number N(b, d) with base b and d digits, all of which are the maximal digit value , we can write:

.
 and
, so
, or

Then

For a three-digit ternary number, .

Compact ternary representation: base 9 and 27
Nonary (base 9, each digit is two ternary digits) or septemvigesimal (base 27, each digit is three ternary digits) can be used for compact representation of ternary, similar to how octal and hexadecimal systems are used in place of binary.

Practical usage

In certain analog logic, the state of the circuit is often expressed ternary. This is most commonly seen in CMOS circuits, and also in transistor–transistor logic with totem-pole output. The output is said to either be low (grounded), high, or open (high-Z). In this configuration the output of the circuit is actually not connected to any voltage reference at all. Where the signal is usually grounded to a certain reference, or at a certain voltage level, the state is said to be high impedance because it is open and serves its own reference. Thus, the actual voltage level is sometimes unpredictable.

A rare "ternary point" in common use is for defensive statistics in American baseball (usually just for pitchers), to denote fractional parts of an inning. Since the team on offense is allowed three outs, each out is considered one third of a defensive inning and is denoted as .1. In this usage, only the fractional part of the number is written in ternary form.

Ternary numbers can be used to convey self-similar structures like the Sierpinski triangle or the Cantor set conveniently. Additionally, it turns out that the ternary representation is useful for defining the Cantor set and related point sets, because of the way the Cantor set is constructed. The Cantor set consists of the points from 0 to 1 that have a ternary expression that does not contain any instance of the digit 1. Any terminating expansion in the ternary system is equivalent to the expression that is identical up to the term preceding the last non-zero term followed by the term one less than the last non-zero term of the first expression, followed by an infinite tail of twos. For example: 0.1020 is equivalent to 0.1012222... because the expansions are the same until the "two" of the first expression, the two was decremented in the second expansion, and trailing zeros were replaced with trailing twos in the second expression.

Ternary is the integer base with the lowest radix economy, followed closely by binary and quaternary. This is due to its proximity to the mathematical constant e. It has been used for some computing systems because of this efficiency. It is also used to represent three-option trees, such as phone menu systems, which allow a simple path to any branch.

A form of redundant binary representation called a binary signed-digit number system, a form of signed-digit representation, is sometimes used in low-level software and hardware to accomplish fast addition of integers because it can eliminate carries.

Binary-coded ternary
Simulation of ternary computers using binary computers, or interfacing between ternary and binary computers, can involve use of binary-coded ternary (BCT) numbers, with two or three bits used to encode each trit. BCT encoding is analogous to binary-coded decimal (BCD) encoding. If the trit values 0, 1 and 2 are encoded 00, 01 and 10, conversion in either direction between binary-coded ternary and binary can be done in logarithmic time. A library of C code supporting BCT arithmetic is available.

Tryte
Some ternary computers such as the Setun defined a tryte to be six trits or approximately 9.5 bits (holding more information than the de facto binary byte).

See also
 Ternary logic
 Tai Xuan Jing
 Setun, a ternary computer
 Qutrit
 Ternary floating point

References

Further reading

External links
 Ternary Arithmetic 
 The ternary calculating machine of Thomas Fowler
 Ternary Base Conversionincludes fractional part, from Maths Is Fun
 Gideon Frieder's replacement ternary numeral system

Computer arithmetic
Positional numeral systems
Ternary computers